El Qurein is a city in the Sharqia Governorate of Egypt. As of 2006 it had an estimated population of 64,453.

Geography
It has an average elevation of 26 metres (88 feet).

References

Populated places in Sharqia Governorate